Priscilla Block is an extended play (EP) by American country singer–songwriter Priscilla Block. It was released on April 30, 2021, via InDent Records and Mercury Nashville. The project contained six tracks, all of which were co-written by Block herself. Also included on the EP was Block's breakout single titled "Just About Over You".

Background and content
Priscilla Block developed a growing fan base through social media with songs like "Thick Thighs" and "PMS". Among these songs was "Just About Over You", which gained such a following that Block was able to sign a recording contract in 2020. Block described her self-titled EP as a project that came from a sensitive place: "This EP is such a vulnerable side of who I am and where I’ve been...It’s my story of falling apart in order to find myself again." The disc was produced by Ross Copperman, along with Robbie Artress, Jake Curry and Justin Johnson. 

The EP contained a total of six tracks. These songs were all co-written by Block with other songwriters. Five of the album's tracks featured co-writes from Sarah Jones, while two tracks featured Emily Kroll. Block has described both Jones and Kroll as friends. "there’s something about the three of us girls getting together, where I feel we always write great songs," she told Songwriter Universe.

Release and promotion
Priscilla Block was released on April 30, 2021. It was released through Mercury Nashville as a compact disc. It was issued digitally through Mercury Nashville and InDent Records. To promote the disc, Block performed a live-streamed concert through the Hard Rock cafe in Nashville, Tennessee. In the days that followed, Block also appeared for the first time at the Grand Ole Opry. The album's opening track, "Wish You Were the Whiskey", was released as a promotional single was issued on April 7, 2021. "I Bet You Wanna Know" was later issued as a second promotional single in 2021. The EP also included the radio single, "Just About Over You". The song became a top 15 hit single on the American Hot Country Songs chart in 2021.

Track listing

Personnel
All credits are adapted from the liner notes of Priscilla Block and AllMusic.

Musical personnel
 Stone Aielli – Piano
 Robbie Artress – Acoustic guitar, electric guitar, piano
 Josh Beale – Acoustic guitar, background vocals, electric guitar
 Priscilla Block – Background vocals, lead vocals
 Dave Cohen – Keyboards
 Jim Cooley – Background vocals
 Jake Curry – Background vocals, electric guitar
 Sarah Jones – Background vocals
 Tony Lucido – Bass
 Danny Rader – Acoustic guitar, banjo, bouzouki, electric guitar, Hammond B3 organ, percussion, piano, synthesizer
 Jerry Roe – Drums
 Jimmie Lee Sloas – Bass guitar
 Bryan Sutton – Banjo, dobro, acoustic guitar, 12-string acoustic guitar, mandolin
 Derek Wells – Electric guitar
 Nir Z – Drums, percussion

Technical personnel
 Stone Aielli – Programming
 Ribbie Artress – Editing, producer, programming, recording
 Sean R. Badum – Assistant engineer
 Drew Bollman – Recording
 Jim Cooley – Engineer
 Ross Copperman – Engineer, mixing, producing, programming
 Jake Curry – Producer, programming
 Mike "Frog" Griffifth – Production coordinator
 Justin Johnson – Producer, programming
 Scott Johnson – Production coordination 
 Zack Kuhlman – Mixing assistant
 Tony Lucido – Engineer
 Andrew Mendelson – Mastering engineer
 Danny Rader – Programming, engineer
 Lance Van Dyke – Assistant engineer

Release history

References

2021 EPs
Albums produced by Ross Copperman
Priscilla Block EPs
Universal Music Group EPs